The Ninety-Ninth Wisconsin Legislature was convened on January 5, 2009.  The session was scheduled to end on January 3, 2011, and the final adjournment for regular legislative activity occurred on May 26, 2010.  During the course of the 99th Legislature, there were two Special sessions and four Extraordinary sessions called for various legislative purposes.

Major events
 January 20, 2009: Inauguration of Barack Obama as the 44th President of the United States.
 February 17, 2009: American Recovery and Reinvestment Act of 2009 was signed into law by President Obama.
 March 6, 2009: The Dow Jones Industrial Average hit 6,443.27, its lowest level of the Financial crisis of 2007–2008. Down 54% from its peak at 14,164 on October 9, 2007.
 May 12, 2009: The Wisconsin Senate called an Extraordinary session to deal with Assembly Bill 255 — relating to eligibility for unemployment benefits and other matters relating to disbursement of funds from the federal American Recovery and Reinvestment Act of 2009.
 June 9, 2009: The Wisconsin Senate called an Extraordinary session to deal with Senate Bill 232 — relating to payment of funds to state public schools.
 June 24, 2009: Wisconsin Governor Jim Doyle called a Special session of the Legislature to act upon legislation relating to the hospital assessment, medical assistance and collecting federal revenue related to the assessment.
 December 16, 2009: The Wisconsin Senate called an Extraordinary session to deal with Senate Bill 66 — relating to laws on driving under the influence of alcohol.
 December 16, 2009: Wisconsin Governor Jim Doyle called a Special session of the Legislature to act on Senate Bill 405 and Assembly Bill 534 — relating to rules governing the Milwaukee Public Schools.
 November 2, 2010: Scott Walker elected 45th Governor of Wisconsin.

Major legislation
 January 29, 2009: Act relating to payment of Wisconsin supplemental and extended unemployment insurance benefits in this state. 2009 Wisc. Act 1
 May 15, 2009: Act relating to eligibility for unemployment insurance benefits and payment of extended benefits; excluding recovery and reinvestment act moneys from the calculation of expenditure restraint payments; eligibility for participation in the programs of a community action agency; financial assistance under the Clean Water Fund Program and the Safe Drinking Water Loan Program; the confidentiality of pupil records provided to the Department of Public Instruction; financial assistance for criminal justice programs; authorizing political subdivisions to make residential energy efficiency improvement loans and impose special charges for the loans; definition of low-income household under energy and weatherization assistance programs; eligibility and notice changes for state continuation of coverage for health insurance; changes to enterprise zone jobs credits; state aid to school districts; providing an exemption from emergency rule procedures; granting rule-making authority; and making an appropriation. 2009 Wisc. Act 11
 June 11, 2009: Act relating to the payment of state school aid in June 2009. 2009 Wisc. Act 23
 December 22, 2009: Act relating to operating a vehicle while intoxicated, granting rule-making authority, making an appropriation, and providing a penalty. 2009 Wisc. Act 100 — lowering the legal blood-alcohol limit for operating a vehicle from 0.1 to 0.08, among other changes to law.
 May 18, 2010: Act relating to financial assistance related to bioenergy feedstocks, biorefineries, and conversion to biomass energy; the definition of the term agricultural use for the purpose of determining the assessed value of a parcel of land; requiring a strategic bioenergy feedstock assessment; creation of a bioenergy council; the agricultural and forestry diversification programs; biofuels training assessment; a study of regulatory burdens relating to biofuel production facilities; marketing orders and agreements for bioenergy feedstocks; exempting personal renewable fuel production and use from the motor vehicle fuel tax, the petroleum inspection fee, and business tax registration requirements; an income and franchise tax credit for installing or retrofitting pumps that mix motor vehicle fuels from separate storage tanks; offering gasoline that is not blended with ethanol to motor fuel dealers; state renewable motor vehicle fuels sales goals; use of petroleum-based transportation fuels by state vehicles; use of alternative fuels in flex fuel vehicles owned by the state; use of public alternative fuel refueling facilities; duties of the Office of Energy Independence; granting rule-making authority; requiring the exercise of rule-making authority; making appropriations; and providing penalties. 2009 Wisc. Act 401

Party summary

Senate

Assembly

Sessions
 Regular session: January 5, 2009May 26, 2010
 May 2009 Extraordinary session: May 12, 2009May 13, 2009
 June 2009 Extraordinary session: June 9, 2009June 11, 2009
 June 2009 Special session (JN9): June 24, 2009June 27, 2009
 December 2009 Extraordinary session: December 16, 2009
 December 2009 Special session (DE9): December 16, 2009March 9, 2010

Officers

Senate
 President of the Senate: Sen. Fred Risser
 President pro tempore: Sen. Pat Kreitlow
 Chief Clerk: Hon. Robert J. Marchant
 Sergeant at arms: Hon. Edward A. Blazel

Assembly
 Speaker of the Assembly: Rep. Michael J. Sheridan
 Speaker pro tempore: Rep. Tony Staskunas
 Chief clerk: Hon. Patrick E. Fuller
 Sergeant at arms: Hon. William Nagy

Members

Senate
Members of the Wisconsin Senate for the Ninety-ninth Wisconsin Legislature (33):

Assembly
Members of the Assembly for the Ninety-ninth Wisconsin Legislature (99):

Changes from the 98th Legislature

Open seats
In the 12th Senate District, Democrat Roger Breske was appointed Railroad Commissioner, leaving Democrat Jim Holperin to defeat Republican Tom Tiffany.
In the 18th Senate District, Republican Carol Roessler was appointed Administrator of State and Local Finance, leaving Republican Randy Hopper to defeat Democrat Jessica King.
 In the 22nd Assembly District, Democrat Sheldon Wasserman ran for the Wisconsin State Senate, leaving fellow Democrat Sandy Pasch to defeat Republican Yash Wadhwa
In the 24th Assembly District, Republican Suzanne Jeskewitz decided not to run for re-election, leaving Republican Dan Knodl to defeat Democrat Charlene Brady.
In the 47th Assembly District, Republican Eugene Hahn declined to run for re-election, leaving Republican Keith Ripp to defeat Democrat Trish O'Neil in the contest for the open seat.
In the 50th Assembly District, Republican Sheryl Albers retired, leaving Republican Ed Brooks to defeat Democrat Tom Crofton
In the 53rd Assembly District, Republican Carol Owens retired, leaving Republican Richard Spanbauer to defeat Democrat Jeff Mann.
In the 57th Assembly District, Republican Steve Wieckert retired, and Democrat Penny Bernard Schaber defeated Republican Jo Egelhoff in the general election
In the 64th Assembly District, Democrat James Kreuser became County Executive for Kenosha County, leaving former Congressman and fellow Democrat Peter Barca to retake his former seat, running unopposed in the general election.
In the 73rd Assembly District, Democrat Frank Boyle retired, leaving Democrat Nick Milroy to defeat the independent Jeff Monaghan.
In the 81st Assembly District, Democrat David Travis retired, leaving Democrat Kelda Roys to win the seat after running unopposed in the general election.
In the 91st Assembly District, Democrat Barbara Gronemus retired, leaving Democrat Chris Danou to defeat Republican Dave Hegenbarth.
In the 92nd Assembly District, Republican Terry Musser retired, leaving Democrat Mark Radcliffe to defeat Dan Hellman

Incumbents defeated
 In the 2nd Assembly District, Republican Frank Lasee was defeated in the general election by Democrat Ted Zigmunt.
In the 42nd Assembly District, Republican J.A. Hines lost his bid for re-election against Democrat Fred Clark
In the 68th Assembly District, Republican Terry Moulton was defeated by Democrat Kristen Dexter.

Other
In the 67th Assembly District, Jeffrey Wood successfully ran for re-election as an independent after dropping his affiliation with the Republican Party in 2008.

References

External links

Wisconsin legislative sessions
2009 in Wisconsin
2010s in Wisconsin